Nienstädt is a Samtgemeinde ("collective municipality") in the district of Schaumburg, in Lower Saxony, Germany. Its seat is in the village Helpsen.

The Samtgemeinde Nienstädt consists of the following municipalities:
 Helpsen 
 Hespe 
 Nienstädt 
 Seggebruch

Samtgemeinden in Lower Saxony